Street food of Mumbai  is the food sold by hawkers from portable market stalls in Mumbai. It is one of the characteristics of the city. The city is known for its distinctive street foods. Although street food is common all over India, street food in Mumbai is noted because people from all economic classes eat on the roadside almost round the clock and it is sometimes felt that the taste of street food is better than restaurants in the city. Many Mumbaikars like a small snack on the road in the evening. People of Mumbai cutting across barriers of class, religion, gender and ethnicity are passionate about street food. Street food vendors are credited by some for developing the city's food culture. Street food in Mumbai is relatively inexpensive as compared to restaurants and vendors tend to be clustered around crowded areas such as colleges and railway stations.

Variety

Mumbai being the capital (and the largest urban area) of Maharashtra is dominated by Maharashtrian food. Vada pav is noted as the most popular street food in Mumbai. Other noted street foods in Mumbai include panipuri, bhelpuri, sevpuri, dahipuri, sandwiches, ragda-pattice, pav bhaji, Chinese bhel, idlis and dosas, all of which are vegetarian. In terms of non-vegetarian offerings, omelette-pav, kebabs and fish are found on Mumbai streets. The amount of variety of street food is attributed to the cosmopolitan culture of the city. In the 1980s, Indianised Chinese food was an emerging trend on Mumbai streets. Other popular street food items include Misal pav (spicy curry made of sprouted moth beans which is eaten with paav, Indian bread roll typically a bun), and vegetable frankie (a popular and cheaper version of wraps and rolls).

Kulfi (frozen dairy dessert similar to ice cream) and golah (Indian snow cone sometimes served on a stick) are among the desserts and coolants found on Mumbai streets. Apart from snacks, Mumbai has several juice and milkshake bars on the roadside that offer a variety of juices and milkshakes. Fresh Sugarcane juice vendors are synonymous with Mumbai roads and offer a cheap form of refreshment. Tea vendors cycle around the city, selling the beverage hot on the streets. Street vendors normally remain unaffected by general strike calls and do business all year around. Paan, a betel leaf preparation eaten as a mouth freshener post meals in India is also sold at Mumbai's roadside stalls.

Areas and spread
Lanes with a sizable cluster of street food stalls are known as Khau Galli locally which mean 'Food Alley' in Marathi. Girgaum Chowpatty beach is noted for its Bhelpuri and kulfi. Street vendors at Nariman Point, one of the city's financial hubs, do brisk business during the lunch hour.

Mumbai's street food has made its way into kitchens of restaurants in the city, including five star hotels. In fact, restaurants in various parts of the world have incorporated Mumbai's street food into their menu cards. Homegrown fast food companies that serve street food in Mumbai have been launched in recent years. Despite the many pros and cons of street food, it forms a daily diet of many office goers and college students in the city.

Controversies

Some people avoid street food because of hygiene issues, however the larger public, irrespective of class enjoy Mumbai's street food. Restaurants and hotels have capitalised on this phenomenon by offering street food to their clientele. A large number of hawkers trade illegally, without mandatory permits from the local municipality, by bribing officials. Drives to evict hawkers are regularly held, though the hawkers return after a short period of time. Equipment and other goods seized from illegal hawkers are returned by the municipality after the hawker pays a fine. In 2007, the Supreme Court ruled in a case against illegal hawking by asking the municipality to demarcate 230 areas in the city as legal hawking zones, a number that was later increased to 1700 areas; this is still to be implemented. A news report in 2009 claimed that no hawking licenses had been issued in Mumbai for 20 years and that out of the estimated 250,000 hawkers in the city only about 17,000 had a valid license.

A controversy emerged in 2011, when a panipuri vendor from Thane was filmed urinating into a container that was also used to serve the customers. The event led to a public uproar and a major political drama in the city; Shiv Sena and Maharashtra Navnirman Sena members again attacked North Indians, targeting the Panipuri and Bhelpuri sellers of Mumbai and Thane. The vendor concerned was arrested by the police and taken to court, which fined him and thereafter let him off with a warning. After action against all panipuri vendors across the city by political parties, the vendor in question, who himself was in the business for 15 years, chose to give up the trade altogether and take up a job with a private security agency.

See also
 Street food of Kolkata
 Street food of Chennai

References

Mumbai
Culture of Mumbai